"Breaking Up Slowly" is a song performed by Kato Callebaut featuring vocals from Belgian singer-songwriter Tom Dice. It was released on 13 September 2013 as a digital download in the Netherlands on iTunes. The song was written by Jeroen Swinnen, Koen Buyse, Ashley Hicklin and Kato Callebaut.

Track listing

Credits and personnel
 Lead vocals – Tom Dice
 Lyrics – Jeroen Swinnen, Koen Buyse, Ashley Hicklin, Kato Callebaut
 Producers – Jeroen Swinnen
 Labels – Sony Music Entertainment Belgium

Chart performance

Weekly charts

Release history

References

2013 singles
Tom Dice songs
2013 songs
Songs written by Jeroen Swinnen
Songs written by Ashley Hicklin